"Terminal" is a song by Japanese musician Ayumi Hamasaki. Produced by Dutch trance DJ Armin van Buuren, the song was released as a single from her fifteenth studio album Colours on October 1, 2014.

Background 

Re-cut singles that were songs present on an already released album were common in Hamasaki's career, however "Terminal" is the first instance since "Daybreak" from her fourth studio album I Am..., released in 2002.

Hamasaki had first collaborated with Armin van Buuren in 2001, when he remixed her song "Appears" for Cyber Trance Presents Ayu Trance, with "Appears (Armin van Buuren's Sunset Dub)" later appearing on Cyber Trance Presents Ayu Trance 2 (2002).

Writing and production 

The song was written and produced by Armin van Buuren, as well as his long-time collaborator Benno de Goeij. The dub remix featured on the single was used by van Buuren in his personal DJ sets. Hamasaki recorded the vocals for the song at Record Plant Recording Studios in Los Angeles.

Release and promotion 

For Hamasaki's Premium Showcase: Feel the Love tour in May and June 2014, tour exclusive singles were released at each of the three venues she performed at. For her performances at the Nippon Gaishi Hall in Nagoya on May 30, May 31 and June 1, 2014, a single featuring "XOXO" and "Terminal" was released. The song was first performed at the showcase, in a trance DJ set also featuring "Connected" (2002). The song was initially given a wide release on June 18, when the Colours album was released digitally.

The dub mix of the song was released globally on September 15, though van Buuren's label Armind. It also featured on A State Of Trance at Ushuaïa, Ibiza 2014, a mix CD created by van Buuren compiling the music played at his residency show at the Ushuaïa Beach Hotel in Ibiza. The single's Japanese release was timed to be released at the same time as Ultra Japan, an EDM festival in Odaiba, Tokyo held on September 27 and 28, 2014. On the same day as the single's release, Hamasaki released her song "XOXO" as a Plug Air: a new format featuring a physical device that plugs into cellphones to stream content.

Track listings

Personnel

Personnel details were sourced from "Terminal"'s liner notes booklet.

Musicians and personnel
Armin van Buuren – music, production
Benno de Goeij – music, production
Ayumi Hamasaki – lyrics, vocals
Dave Kutch – mastering

Chart rankings

Sales

Release history

References 

2014 songs
2014 singles
Japanese-language songs
Ayumi Hamasaki songs
Songs written by Ayumi Hamasaki
Songs written by Armin van Buuren
Avex Trax singles
Song recordings produced by Max Matsuura
Songs written by Benno de Goeij